"I Stayed Long Enough" is a song written and originally recorded by American country artist, Tammy Wynette. It first appeared as an album track on Wynette's 1969 album, Stand by Your Man. It was then recorded and released as a single by American country artist, Billie Jo Spears. Her version reached the top 40 of the American country chart in 1970.

Tammy Wynette version
Tammy Wynette had becoming one of the country genre's most successful artists by the sixties. She had several singles top the country chart and reach the top ten. Among these songs was her signature 1969 recording of "Stand by Your Man". "I Stayed Long Enough" was recorded around the same time as her signature tune. The track was recorded some time between March and August 1968 at the Columbia Studio B in Nashville, Tennessee. It was produced by Billy Sherrill. Additionally, the song was composed by Tammy Wynette. The song was later included on Wynette's studio album, Stand by Your Man. The disc was released in January 1969.

Billie Jo Spears version

Background, recording, and release
Billy Jo Spears had recently obtained commercial success with her first top ten country hit, "Mr. Walker, It's All Over". She followed the song with a series of charting singles, all of which were issued on the Capitol Records label. Among her charting singles was "I Stayed Long Enough". The song was recorded at the Jack Clement Recording Studio, located in Nashville, Tennessee. It was produced by George Richey in June 1970.

"I Stayed Long Enough" was released as a single by Capitol Records in October 1970. It was backed on the B-side by the song, "Come on Home". The disc was issued as a seven-inch vinyl single. The song entered America's Billboard Hot Country Songs in November 1970. It spent a total of nine weeks there, reaching the number 30 position in December 1970. It became Spears's fourth top 40 single on the country survey. The song was later included on Spears's 1970 studio album, Country Girl.

Track listing
7" vinyl single
 "I Stayed Long Enough" – 2:12
 "Come on Home" – 2:23

Charts

References

1969 songs 
1970 singles
Billie Jo Spears songs
Capitol Records singles
Tammy Wynette songs
Songs written by Tammy Wynette
Song recordings produced by Billy Sherrill
Song recordings produced by George Richey